Bluebird (Sally Avril), sometimes rendered Blue Bird, is a fictional character appearing in American comic books published by Marvel Comics. She is usually depicted as a supporting character in the Spider-Man series.

Publication history
Created by Stan Lee and Steve Ditko, Sally Avril first appeared in Amazing Fantasy #15 (1962). Sally was a minor member of Flash Thompson's entourage, appearing in only one issue during the Silver Age. Her "Bluebird" career was created by Busiek (scripts) and Olliffe (pencils) in 1996.

Fictional character biography
Sally Avril was a fellow student of Peter Parker's at Midtown High who turned him down for a date, preferring Flash Thompson.

Thirty years later, writing for Untold Tales of Spider-Man, Kurt Busiek resurrected the one-note brunette from obscurity and gave her a background. She was an ambitious, thrill-loving girl who took blue ribbons in gymnastics. With fellow popular kid Jason Ionello, she attempted to cash in on a Daily Bugle contest offering a thousand dollars to a reader who brought in pictures of Spider-Man. Although their mission was a bust, Sally loved the thrill and became very smitten with the web-slinger when he touched her cheek just before leaving her and Jason with a warning to give it up.

Sally and Jason tailed Spidey again, who was (unwillingly) working for Electro. The flash from Sally's camera roused Spidey from his hypnotic state, and a well-placed kick by the athletic young Sally took Electro by surprise long enough for Spidey to readjust his mask — which Electro had been preparing to remove — and defeat him. Spider-Man posed for a shot with an ecstatic Sally and Jason that the Bugle ran.

Suffused with glee, Sally tried to get a permanent gig on the Bugle, but was told the photographer's job was filled — by Peter Parker. Peter admitted this but asked her not to tell their fellow Midtowners. Sally donned an eccentric blue-and-white costume and decided, with her aerobic skills, to become a superheroine. She asked Peter to take some Bugle pics of her doing some stunts, but Peter refused. Angered, she threatened to blackmail him by revealing that he took Spider-Man pictures, but he undercut her by telling them himself.

Bluebird's zeal but lack of experience caused trouble for Spider-Man during fights with Scarlet Beetle and Electro. Her "ether egg" weapons would detonate prematurely or have little effect, once even allowing the villain to escape. Considering her more trouble than she was worth, Spider-Man allowed the Black Knight's men to hurt her quite badly in order to dissuade her from interfering in his fights again, although he later felt remorseful.

Bruised but undaunted, Sally and Jason headed to an area where Spider-Man was fighting the Black Knight, with Sally's camera. She intended to capture some shots of the fight. However, Sally's zeal ended up costing her her life when she begged Jason to speed in his car, and the two ran a red light. Their car struck an oncoming bus, with Jason incurring mild head trauma, and Sally being killed. Spider-Man felt horrible about this, blaming himself for her death.

During the Dead No More: The Clone Conspiracy storyline, Sally Avril is cloned by Ben Reilly posing as Jackal and is seen in New U Technologies' facility area called Haven.

Powers and abilities
Bluebird has no superpowers. However, she uses a retractable rope line, insulated boots for protection against electricity, blue paint pellets, and ether-filled "eggs." Additionally, Bluebird is a skilled gymnast.

Reception

Accolades 

 In 2022, CBR.com ranked Sally Avril 2nd in their "10 Best Comic Book Characters Grey DeLisle Has Played" list.

In other media

Television

 Sally Avril appears in The Spectacular Spider-Man, voiced by Grey DeLisle. This version is a cheerleader at Midtown High School, Randy Robertson's blonde, shrill girlfriend, and a member of the school's popular clique who displays "mean girl" traits. As a result unlike her boyfriend, she is unkind to her unpopular peers and bears particular animosity towards Peter Parker, whom she calls the "King of Geeks", though she gradually softens up to him during season two.

Film
 Sally Avril, credited as "Hot Girl", makes a cameo appearance in The Amazing Spider-Man, portrayed by Kelsey Chow. While she goes unnamed in the film, Chow revealed to media outlets around the time of the film's release that her character is Avril and that she would have appeared in another a sequel prior to Sony's deal with Marvel Studios. Additionally, the film's novelization also refers to Chow's character as Avril.
 Sally Avril makes minor appearances in the Marvel Cinematic Universe films Spider-Man: Homecoming (2017) and Avengers: Infinity War (2018), portrayed by Isabella Amara. This version is an intellectually gifted member of the Midtown School of Science and Technology's academic decathlon team.
 Sally returns (via archive and previously unused footage of Amara from Spider-Man: Homecoming) in the post-credits scene of the 2022 extended edition of Spider-Man: No Way Home (2021), depicting the consequences of Doctor Strange's second spell.

References

External links
Sally Avril at The Appendix to the Handbook of the Marvel Universe
Bluebird at Marvel.com
Bluebird at Marvel Database
Bluebird at Comic Vine

Female characters in film
Fictional characters from New York City
Fictional gymnasts
Marvel Comics female characters
Comics characters introduced in 1962
Characters created by Stan Lee
Characters created by Steve Ditko
Characters created by Kurt Busiek
Spider-Man characters
Vigilante characters in comics